Jaime Alcántara Silva (born 13 April 1950) is a Mexican politician from the Institutional Revolutionary Party. He has served as Deputy of the LII and LVIII Legislatures of the Mexican Congress representing Puebla.

References

1950 births
Living people
Politicians from Puebla
Institutional Revolutionary Party politicians
21st-century Mexican politicians
National Autonomous University of Mexico alumni
20th-century Mexican politicians
Deputies of the LVIII Legislature of Mexico
Members of the Chamber of Deputies (Mexico) for Puebla